Aagathan is a 2010 Indian Malayalam-language revenge drama thriller film directed by Kamal and written by Kamal and Kalavoor Ravikumar from a story by Kamal. Starring Dileep,  Sathyaraj, Charmy Kaur and Lal. The music for the film was provided by Ouseppachan. In the plot, a mysterious man Gautham arrives at retired Army General Hareendranath Varma's house, but his arrival has a backstory.

Plot

Gautham Menon's family relocates to Srinagar and adjusts to life in Kashmir. During a terrorist attack on the village, Gautham's parents are killed and his older sister drags him away hides behind some trees. One of the goons spot them hiding, but is killed by an army officer. In a weak moment, the army officer drags Gautham's sister away and her screams are heard off screen. She gets hospitalized, and the doctor asks Gautham to pray for his sister after noticing that she is in a severe condition. Gautham grows into a teenager and receives scholastic awards. He rushes to the hospital to share his excitement with his still-hospitalized sister, only to discover that she is slowly ebbing away.

The narrative shifts to the present, where an adult Gautham Menon (Dileep) visits his elderly uncle Dr. Unnithan (Babu Namboothiri), a physician who is also his childhood mentor and a friend of his late father. Gautham claims that he has been sent to India by his employer and that he has the choice of being stationed either in Bangalore or Chennai.

He visits Major George Joseph (Lal), a retired Army officer who was court martialed from his position for arguing with superiors while intoxicated. He confesses to Gautham that a drunken driving accident caused the deaths of his family. Major recognizes Gautham as the boy from the past who was compassionately consoled by him following the military operation that killed the terrorists who attacked Gautham's village.

Meanwhile, a journalist comes to visit General Hareendranath Varma (Retd) (Sathyaraj) to publish his biography. The General reluctantly accepts the offer. Later, he sees his mother trying to call his daughter Shreya, asking her to stop by while en route to Bangalore so that they could proceed with her marriage to an NRI boy. Knowing her granny's intentions, Shreya (Charmy Kaur) dodges the call by saying she can hardly hear her while travelling on the bus. The bus hits an old woman and Gautham carries the woman to the bus demanding to take her to a hospital. He asks Shreya's help to carry her to the hospital. The driver takes the bus leaving behind Gautham and Shreya at the hospital. Later the relatives of the victim come to hospital and take money from Gautham as compensation. Gautham and Shreya leave and have to wait till 10 PM to catch the next Bus to Bangalore, where Shreya has to pay all the expenses.

Shreya finds Gautham gone in the morning, but after repaying her the expenses and a note left behind. She is picked up by her cousin and cousin's husband Dr. Sudhir Krishna (Biju Menon). Coincidentally, Gautham has also rented the house owned by Sudhir's brother and befriends his family, though he tactfully dodges Shreya every time she sees him. Shreya develops a fondness towards Gautham, despite not knowing anything about him including his name. Meanwhile, her Grandma arrives to Bangalore and Sudhir comes up with the proposal of Gautham for Shreya. Grandma likes Gautham upon seeing him. But Shreya, already in love with ‘stranger’, does not agree to it. Later ‘stranger’ reveals himself to Shreya as Gautham. Varma invites Gautham to his farmhouse to meet him. Gautham wins everybody's heart with his polite and gentle manner. Later he beats the General in a chess game and gains his admiration. At that moment Gautham reveals himself as a survivor of the terrorist attack foiled by Varma's army which upsets the general.

Gautham speaks to the General in private and reveals the truth that his sister was cruelly raped by the then commanding officer Varma after killing all the terrorists, knocking her unconscious for the rest of her life. Varma had asked Major George, who was a silent witness to his cruelty, to report it as a terrorist act thereby hid the truth. Gautham swears to the General that he will make him reveal the truth to everyone.

Gautham gets close to everyone in the family which annoys Varma who tries everything to get rid of him. Gautham proves to Varma that Shreya is madly in love with him. Varma takes Gautham out for a ride and threatens to kill him by pointing a gun, but Gautham has already texted Shreya to follow them, thereby foiling Varma's attempt. Later, Varma almost succeeds in killing Gautham by locking him in a wine ageing barrel, but Gautham escapes with the help of Lawrence (Innocent), Varma's servant. He challenges Varma that he will make him reveal the secret in two days, i.e. at the engagement ceremony.

A large party of the General's ex-colleagues, including Major George, is invited to the function by Gautham using Varma's email id. It is also revealed that the journalist chronicling Varma's biography has also been sent by Gautham to trap him. The media people are also invited. All this has been done so that when the truth is revealed, it will be to everyone.

At the function, Varma presents himself in the Army General's uniform. He reveals the secret to all the invited guests in the guise of a dirty plan by Gautham to blackmail him. Varma also says that if anyone among the guests believes the story, he will shoot himself, but all remain silent. Gautham challenges the General to shoot him if the story was a scam. Though the General points the gun towards Gautham, he cannot pull himself to shoot him, thereby silently admitting the crime and all the guests turn against him. Guilt ridden and realizing his mistake, he leaves the scene and kills himself after writing down the confession to the President of India and returning all the accolades and awards he received during his service.

The film ends with Shreya sitting in an airport receiving a letter passed on to her. It is from Gautham asking her if she still has feelings for him. She sees him sitting across the waiting area smiling at her.

Cast
 Dileep as Gautham Menon
 Sathyaraj as General Hareendranath Varma (Retd) (Voice dubbed by Sai Kumar)
 Charmy Kaur as Shreya
 Lal as Major George Joseph (Retd)
 Biju Menon as Dr. Sudhir Krishna
 Innocent as Lawrence
 Zarina Wahab as Malathi Varma
 Valsala Menon as Shreya's Grandmother
 Rony David as Journalist Akbar Ali
 Shafna as Gautham's Sister
 Anand as Gautham's Father
 Archana Menon as Gautham's Mother
 Majeed as Rakhi's and Deepthi's Father
 Ambika Mohan as Rakhi's and Deepthi's Mother
 Babu Namboothiri as Dr. Unnithan
 Shilpa Bala as Deepthi
 Reena Basheer as Rakhi

Production 
Dileep signed into play the male lead while Tamil actor Sathyaraj signed into play the antagonist marking his Malayalam debut. Vidya Balan was considered to play the female lead even though she was interested in the character couldn't take up due to prior commitments. Later Mamta Mohandas signed into play the role but opted out citing health issues. Finally Telugu actress Charmy Kaur replaced the latter marking her come back to Malayalam industry after a hiatus of 8 years.

Soundtrack
The film's soundtrack, composed by Ouseppachan and lyrics penned by Kaithapram, was met with positive reviews. Shreya Ghoshal, who performed one of the tracks, won the Best Female Playback Singer Award at the 13th Asianet Film Awards. She also won the Kerala Film Critics Award for Best Female Playback Singer.

Reception
The film received mixed reviews from both critics and audience. Veeyen of Nowrunning.com commented "Aagathan has an 'I know what's round the corner' quality all over it despite a stunning backdrop and an unusually subtle soundtrack. It's a psychodrama gone wrong, precisely because the denouement that it hopes to cash on is a bit too obvious, and comes at the wrong instant". The film was acclaimed well by the audience by the choreography done in the film.

Box office
The film had a hard competition with Chattambinadu, Ividam Swargamanu, Happy Husbands, Drona 2010 and Dileep's other film Bodyguard. The film was declared average success at box office.

References

External links 
 
 
 Aagathan at Oneindia.in

2010 films
Indian thriller drama films
Films scored by Ouseppachan
2010s Malayalam-language films
Films shot in Tamil Nadu
Films shot in Bangalore
Films shot in Ladakh
Indian Army in films
Films directed by Kamal (director)